is a Japanese FM station based in Yokote, Akita, Japan.

Stations
Yokote 77.4 Mhz 20w 
Omori 77.4 Mhz 20w 
Masuda 77.4 Mhz 20w 
Sannai 77.4 Mhz 20w
Saruhannai 77.4 Mhz 20w
Nango 77.4 Mhz 20w
Saruhannai 77.4 Mhz 20w 
Horowa 77.4 Mhz 10w 
Sakabe 77.4 Mhz 10w 
Yoshiyachi 77.4 Mhz 10w
Ueta 77.4 Mhz 10w 
Kanazawa 77.4 Mhz 5w

References

Radio stations in Japan
Radio stations established in 2011
Mass media in Akita Prefecture